The Acolyte was a science fiction fanzine edited by Francis Towner Laney from 1942-1946 (a total of 14 issues), dedicated to articles about fantasy fiction, with particular emphasis on H. P. Lovecraft and his circle. (Laney's essay, "The Cthulhu Mythology: A Glossary", initially published in the Winter 1942 issue, was expanded at the request of August Derleth and became part of the 1943 Arkham House Lovecraft anthology Beyond the Wall of Sleep.) Later issues were co-edited and published by Samuel D. Russell.

Contributors included Clark Ashton Smith and Donald Wandrei. The first two issues were hectographed, the remainder were mimeographed. Due to its influential role in the field, it is indexed in the Science Fiction, Fantasy, & Weird Fiction Magazine Index compiled by Stephen T. Miller & William G. Contento., as well as fanzine indexes.

It was nominated for the 1946 Retrospective Hugo Award for Best Fanzine, losing to Forrest J Ackerman's Voice of the Imagi-Nation.

References

External links 
The Acolyte at the Internet Archive
Scans of issues 7-14

Cthulhu Mythos
Defunct science fiction magazines published in the United States
Magazines established in 1942
Magazines disestablished in 1946
Science fiction magazines established in the 1940s
Science fiction fanzines
H. P. Lovecraft
Magazines published in Los Angeles